Big Hunk is a candy bar made by Annabelle Candy Company. It first entered production in the 1950s, in the United States. It is a bar of roasted peanuts covered in chewy honey-sweetened nougat. It was featured in Steve Almond’s book, Candyfreak, as being one of several successful candies made by a small company. Big Hunk was acquired by Annabelle Candy Company when the company purchased Golden Nugget Candy Company in 1970.

External links
Annabelle Candy website Big Hunk page
Candy Addict review
Annabelle Candy Company website Company History

Candy bars
Annabelle Candy Company brands
Brand name confectionery